Brian Boru Dunne II (January 8, 1924 - November 30, 2017) was Project Orion's chief scientist. Dunne worked on explosive model tests in Point Loma, San Diego alongside Jerry Astl and Morris Scharff. He continued to work for General Atomics and later started his own firm called Ship Systems.

Project Orion 
Dunne was the chief experimental scientist on Project Orion. He worked on Project Orion as an experimentalist. Dunne and Howard Kratz set up a facility for firing explosive-driven plasma jets as sample pusher-plate targets, after explosive-driven flights were cancelled.

Media appearances 
 History Undercover: Code Name Project Orion (1999) 
 To Mars by A-Bomb: The Secret History of Project Orion (BBC, 2003)

References

2017 deaths
1924 births
American scientists